was the 13th daimyō of Morioka Domain in northern Japan and the 39th hereditary chieftain of the Nanbu clan.

Biography

After widespread peasant revolts occurred in Morioka Domain in 1836 and 1847, largely in protest to economic policies and food shortages, Toshitada went into voluntary retirement, and Toshitomo nominally became the new daimyō. However, Toshitomo was ordered to remain at the domain residence in Edo instead of making the usual sankin-kōtai journey to Morioka, and the domain continued to be administered by the karō and other influential samurai who answered only to his father. After around a year, sentiment against Toshitada had died down somewhat in Morioka, so Toshitomo was forced into retirement, and replaced by his more pliable younger brother Nanbu Toshihisa. 

Toshitomo was very angry with this situation, especially as the policies which had resulted in widespread revolts were continued, and the samurai of the domain split into factions supporting either the son or the father. Relations between the two were so bad that at one point a retainer of Toshitada attempted to kill Toshitomo by poisoning.

As Toshitomo had predicted, another widespread revolt occurred in the Nanbu domains against Toshitada in 1853. The situation was so dire that the Tokugawa shogunate was forced to intervene directly. The rōjū Abe Masahiro placed Toshitada under house arrest, where he died a year later. However, Toshitomo was also found culpable of inciting the insurrection, and was confined to a single room within this own house. The same year, he changed his name once again, this time to Nanbu Toshitomo.

Toshitomo remained in Edo through the remainder of the Bakumatsu period, and only visited Morioka as a private citizen after the Meiji Restoration.

References
Papinot, Edmond. (1948). Historical and Geographical Dictionary of Japan. New York: Overbeck Co.
三百藩藩主人名事典 (1986)

External links
 Morioka Domain on "Edo 300 HTML" (3 November 2007)

Notes

1824 births
1888 deaths
Tozama daimyo
Nanbu clan
People of Edo-period Japan